Apantesis edwardsii is a moth of the  family Erebidae. It was described by Stretch in 1872. It is known only from the San Francisco area in California and Klamath County in Oregon.

The length of the forewings is 13.4 mm. The ground colour of the forewings is dark brown with yellowish buff bands. The hindwings are yellow-orange with black markings. Adults have been recorded on wing from May to June. A few September records possibly indicate a second generation.

This species was formerly a member of the genus Grammia, but was moved to Apantesis along with the other species of the genera Grammia, Holarctia, and Notarctia.

References

 Natural History Museum Lepidoptera generic names catalog

Arctiina
Moths described in 1872